California's 44th congressional district is a congressional district in the U.S. state of California. The district is centered in South Los Angeles and the Los Angeles Harbor Region. It is currently represented by Democrat Nanette Barragán. The 44th district was created as a result of the redistricting cycle after the 1980 Census.

The 44th district is composed of these cities and communities: Carson, Compton, East Compton, East Rancho Dominguez, Lynwood, North Long Beach, San Pedro, South Gate, Watts, Walnut Park, West Rancho Dominguez, Willowbrook, and Wilmington.

The congressional district is located in the southern portion of the state and includes part of Los Angeles County. The district's current borders are delineated by the 110 freeway in its western border and takes an inward right following the 105 Freeway. Following S. Central Avenue north, it then zig-zags its way to Florence Ave at its apex. Its eastern border runs mostly along the 710 Freeway until reaching the Pacific Ocean.

Education 
The following school districts serve the area: Los Angeles Unified School District, Compton Unified School District, Lynwood Unified School District, Long Beach Unified School District, and Paramount Unified School District.

California State University Dominguez Hills, Compton Community College, and Charles R Drew University of Medicine and Science are the only institutions of higher education in the district.

The high school graduation rate is 63.9% and bachelor's degree or higher 13.4%

Recent election results in statewide races

Composition

As of the 2020 redistricting, California's 38th congressional district is located in the South Bay region of Los Angeles County.

Los Angeles County is split between this district, the 36th district, the 43rd district, and the 42nd district. The 44th and 36th are partitioned by Sepulveda Blvd, Normandie Ave, Frampton Ave, 253rd St, 255th St, Belle Porte Ave, 256th St, 1720 256th St-1733 256th St, 1701 257th St-1733 257th St, 1734 257th St-W 262nd St, Ozone Ave, 263rd St, 26302 Alta Vista Ave-26356 Alta Vista Ave, Pineknoll Ave, Leesdale Ave, Highway 213, Palos Verde Dr N, 26613 Leesdale Ave-Navy Field, S Western Ave, Westmont Dr, Eastview Park, Mt Rose Rd/Amelia Ave, 1102 W Bloomwood Rd-1514 Caddington Dr, N Western Ave, W Summerland St, N Enrose Ave/Miraleste Dr, Miraleste Dr, Martin J. Bogdanovich Recreation Center and Park, and Shoreline Park.

The 44th and 42nd are partitioned by S Alameda St, Southern Pacific Railroad, Ardmore Ave, Long Beach Blvd, Pacific Blvd, Cudahy St, 2622 Cudahy St-3211 Santa Ana St, Santa Ana St, Salt Lake Ave, Patata St, 7038 Dinwiddie St-10112 Karmont Ave, Imperial Highway, Old River School Rd, Union Pacific Railroad, Gardendale St, Century Blvd, Highway 19. Laurel St, Clark Ave, Beach St, Bellflower Blvd, E Carson St, Woodruff Ave, Gonda Ave, E Wardlow Rd, N Los Coyotes Diagonal, McNab Ave, E Spring St, E Harvey Way, Faculty Ave, E Carson St, Norse Way, Lakewood Golf Course, Cover St, E 36th St, Cherry Ave, Atlantic Ave, E Willow St, Long Beach Blvd, Highway 1, Oregon Ave, W Anaheim St, Los Angeles River, Canal Ave, W 19th St, Santa Fe Ave, Seabright Ave, W 25th St, W Willow St, Middle Rd-East Rd, 2300 E Pacific Coast Highway-W Anaheim St, E Anaheim St-Cerritos Channel, Piers S Ave, Highway 47, and Navy Mole Rd.

The 44th and 43rd are partitioned by Alameda St, E 103rd St, Mona Blvd, E 107th Pl, E 108th St, S Alameda St, Highway 105, Mona Blvd, Santa Fe Ave, E Stockton Ave, N Bullis Rd, Palm Ave/E Killen Pl, N Thorson Ave, McMillan St, Waldorf Dr/N Castlegate Ave, S Gibson Ave, Wright Rd, E Rosecrans Ave, Highway 710, Somerset Blvd, Myrrh St, Hunsake Ave, Alondra Blvd, E Greenleaf Blvd, Main Campus Dr, S Susana Rd, Highway 91, Highway 47, Calle Anita, 2605 Homestead Pl-266 W Apras St, 255 W Victoria St-18300 S Wilmington Ave, W Victoria St, Central Ave, Lincoln Memorial Park, 2600 W Billings St-2973 W Caldwell St, Malloy Ave/S Clymar Ave, W Alondra Blvd, S Figueroa St, W 182nd St, Electric St, and S Western Ave.

The 44th district takes in the cities of Carson, Paramount, South Gate, Lynwood, west side Lakewood, and the North Long Beach neighborhood of Long Beach, as well as the Los Angeles neighborhoods of San Pedro and Wilmington.

Cities & CDP with 10,000 or more people
 Los Angeles - 3,898,747
 Long Beach - 466,742
 Carson - 95,558
 Compton - 94,740
 South Gate - 92,726
 Lakewood - 82,496
 Lynwood - 67,265
 Paramount - 53,733
 Walnut Park - 15,996
 East Rancho Dominguez - 15,135

List of members representing the district

Election results

1982

1984

1986

1988

1990

1992

1994

1996

1998 (Special)

1998

2000

2002

2004

2006

2008

2010

2012

2014

2016

2018

2020

2022

Historical district boundaries
What was once the 44th congressional district is now California's 50th congressional district.

In the 1980s, the 44th district was one of four that divided San Diego.  It covered some of the northern and eastern parts of San Diego County. The district had been held for eight years by Democrat Jim Bates and was considered the most Democratic district in the San Diego area. However, Bates was bogged down in a scandal involving charges of sexual harassment. Randy "Duke" Cunningham won the Republican nomination and hammered Bates about the scandal. He won by just a point, meaning that the San Diego area was represented entirely by Republicans for only the second time since the city was split into three districts after the 1960 United States census.

Between 2003 and 2013, the 44th district covered an area of Southern California from San Clemente in Orange County on the coast, north-by-northeast inland to Riverside County, including the cities of Corona, Norco, Rubidoux, and Riverside.

See also

 List of United States congressional districts

References

External links
 GovTrack.us: California's 44th congressional district
 RAND California Election Returns: District Definitions
 California Voter Foundation map - CD44

44
Government of Los Angeles County, California
Government of Los Angeles
Los Angeles Harbor Region
South Los Angeles
Carson, California
Compton, California
Downey, California
Lynwood, California
San Pedro, Los Angeles
South Gate, California
Torrance, California
Willowbrook, California
Wilmington, Los Angeles
Constituencies established in 1983
1983 establishments in California